Parablennius salensis is a species of combtooth blenny found in the eastern central Atlantic ocean near the coasts of Cape Verde. It was first named and described by Hans Bath in 1990. This species reaches a length of  TL.

Etymology
The species name salensis refers to the island of Sal (Cape Verde), the type location. Its common name in Portuguese and Capeverdean Creole is "mané-cabeça".

References

salensis
Fish described in 1990
Fish of the Atlantic Ocean
Fish of West Africa
Fauna of Sal, Cape Verde
Taxa named by Hans Bath